Janikatala  is a village development committee in Parsa District in the Narayani Zone of southern Nepal. At the time of the 2011 Nepal census it had a population of 4,402 people living in 616 individual households. There were 2,200 males and 2,202 females at the time of census.

References

Populated places in Parsa District